William Arntz is an American film director and producer, best known for directing What the Bleep Do We Know?

Filmography
 1980 – Producer, Writer, Director, Beat the Deva
 2000 – Producer, Clouds (producer)
 2004 – Producer, Writer, Director, What the Bleep Do We Know?
 2006 – Producer, Writer, Director, What the Bleep! Down the Rabbit Hole (extended edition of What the Bleep for DVD release)
 2010 – Producer, Writer, Director, GhettoPhysics: Will the Real Pimps and Hos Please Stand Up

Sources
 
 

Living people
American film directors
American film producers
German-language film directors
Year of birth missing (living people)